Potem nastąpi cisza is a 1965 Polish drama film directed by Janusz Morgenstern.

Cast
 Tadeusz Łomnicki as Major Swietowiec
 Marek Perepeczko as Lieutenant Kolski
 Daniel Olbrychski as Olewicz
 Barbara Brylska as Ewa
 Barbara Sołtysik as Zosia
 Kazimierz Fabisiak as Zosia's Father
 Witold Pyrkosz as Leoniak
 Eugeniusz Korczarowski as Adam
 Damian Damięcki as Andrzej
 Tadeusz Schmidt as General

References

External links
 

1965 films
1965 drama films
Polish drama films
Polish black-and-white films
1960s Polish-language films